Bahuaja-Sonene National Park is a protected area located in the regions of Puno and Madre de Dios, in Peru.

Geography
The park comprises river terraces, hills and mountains, with elevations ranging from 500 to 2450 m. The main rivers in the area are: Heath, Tambopata and Candamo. The park shares borders with Madidi National Park in Bolivia to the east and Tambopata National Reserve to the north.

Ecology

Flora 
Plant species found inside the park include: Virola sebifera, Cedrela odorata, Spondias mombin, Celtis schippii, Bertholletia excelsa, Ficus insipida, Hevea guianensis, Cedrelinga cateniformis, Iriartea deltoidea, Calycophyllum spruceanum, Guadua weberbaueri, Theobroma cacao, Miconia spp., Annona ambotay, Swietenia macrophylla, Myroxylon balsamum, Astrocaryum murumuru, Enterolobium cyclocarpum, Mauritia flexuosa, etc.

Fauna 
Birds found inside the park include: the white-tailed goldenthroat, the Neotropic cormorant, the blue-and-yellow macaw, the harpy eagle, the white-throated toucan, the horned curassow, the great egret, the scarlet macaw, the bat falcon, the jabiru, the swallow-tailed hummingbird, etc.

Mammals found in the park include: the giant otter, the South American tapir, the marsh deer, the jaguar, the maned wolf, the puma, the bush dog, etc.

Environmental issues 
The park is rich in natural resources including timber, gold, rubber, and wild game. The Candamo deposit (Block 78), which contains  of natural gas and 120 million of barrels of natural gas condensates, was formerly owned by Mobil and now lies partly within the reserve. Legislation proposed in 2007 to remove the block from the reserve was turned down.

References

Further reading
 Thomsen, JB.;Mitchell, C.;Piland, R.; Donnaway, JR. Monitoring impact of hydrocarbon exploration in sensitive terrestrial ecosystems: perspectives from Block 78 in Peru. In: Bowles IA, Prickett GT., editors. Footprints in the jungle. New York: Oxford University Press; 2001. p. 332.

External links
 Tambopata National Reserve and Bahuaja-Sonene National Park. Profile at parkswatch.org. 
Bahuaja Sonene National Park. Profile at protectedplanet.net

National parks of Peru
Protected areas established in 1996
Geography of Madre de Dios Region
Tourist attractions in Madre de Dios Region